Thomas Ingram (died after 1434), of Shere, Surrey, was an English politician, landowner and member of the gentry.

Family
Nothing is recorded of his family.

Career
He was a Member (MP) of the Parliament of England for Guildford in 1415.

References

14th-century births
15th-century deaths
English MPs 1415
People from Surrey
Members of Parliament for Guildford